Canutillo is a village in Ocampo Municipality in Durango, Mexico. Canutillo has a population of about 614 residents.

References

Populated places in Durango